"She's Just an Old Love Turned Memory" is a song written by John Schweers, and recorded by American country music artist Charley Pride.  It was released in January 1977 as the second single and title track from the album She's Just an Old Love Turned Memory.  The song was his seventeenth number one on the country chart.  The single stayed at number one for a single week and spent a total of ten weeks on country charts.

Charts

Weekly charts

Year-end charts

References
 

1977 songs
Charley Pride songs
1977 singles
RCA Records singles
Songs written by John Schweers
Torch songs